Odalric was made Archbishop of Reims in 962.  He was from a Lotharingian family and claimed to descend from Bishop Arnulf of Metz.

Sources
Annals of Flodoard of Reims

10th-century archbishops
Archbishops of Reims